Shaunard Trudell Harts (born August 4, 1978) is a former American football safety in the National Football League (NFL). He played for the Kansas City Chiefs from 2001 to 2004. Born and raised in Pittsburg, California; Shaunard excelled at basketball and football while attending Pittsburg High School. Although he played as a safety at Boise State and in the NFL, Shaunard starred as a running back in high school. He was drafted in the 7th round of the 2001 NFL Draft, as was fellow Pittsburg native, Joe Tafoya.

References

1978 births
Living people
People from Pittsburg, California
American football safeties
Boise State Broncos football players
Kansas City Chiefs players
Players of American football from California
Sportspeople from the San Francisco Bay Area